The 2nd Regiment of Bengal Native Infantry was a Commonwealth (specifically, Indian) infantry unit that mutinied from command in 1857.

Chronology 
1758 raised in Burdwan as the Burdwan Battalion
1762 ranked as 8th Battalion
1764 became the 2nd (M'Lean) Battalion and moved to Madras under Captain M'Lean 
1765  posted to the 1st Brigade
1775 renumbered 1st Battalion Bengal Native Infantry
1781 became the 1st Regiment Bombay Native Infantry
1784 became the 1st Regiment Bengal Native Infantry
1786 became the 1st Battalion Bengal Native Infantry
1796 became the 1st Battalion 1st Regiment Bengal Native Infantry
1824 became the 2nd Regiment Bengal Native Infantry
1859 disarmed at Barrackpore and disbanded

In 1861, after the mutiny, the title was given to the 31st Regiment of Bengal Light Infantry which later became the 2nd Queen Victoria's Own Rajput Light Infantry

References

Honourable East India Company regiments
Bengal Native Infantry